The Mount Vernon Terminal Railroad  is a terminal railroad located in Mt. Vernon, Washington.

Routes
The MVT runs on the former Pacific Northwest Traction Company interurban tracks, and interchanges with the BNSF Railway's Seattle-Vancouver mainline.

Washington (state) railroads